The 2016 UCI Mountain Bike World Cup was a series of races in two disciplines: Olympic Cross-Country (XCO) and Downhill (DHI). The cross-country series had six rounds and the downhill series had seven rounds.

Cross-country

Elite

Under 23

Downhill

Series classification

Men

Women

See also
2016 UCI Mountain Bike & Trials World Championships

References

External links

 UCI Homepage
 2016 UCI Mountain Bike World Cup Calendar
 2016 UCI Mountain Bike World Cup Media Guide

UCI Mountain Bike World Cup
Mountain Bike World Cup